Tomáš Mrkva (born 20 January 1989) is a Czech handball player for THW Kiel and the Czech national team.

References

External links

1989 births
Living people
Czech male handball players
People from Havířov
Expatriate handball players
Czech expatriate sportspeople in Germany
Handball-Bundesliga players
Frisch Auf Göppingen players
Bergischer HC players
THW Kiel players
Sportspeople from the Moravian-Silesian Region